The Cape Breton Eagles are a major junior ice hockey team in the Quebec Major Junior Hockey League (QMJHL). Their home rink is Centre 200 in Sydney, Nova Scotia, Canada.

History

The franchise was originally granted to the Sorel Éperviers (Black Hawks) for the 1969–70 season. They then moved from Sorel to Verdun in 1977 to become the Verdun Éperviers. In 1979, they played in both Sorel and Verdun before moving back to Sorel for the next season. In 1981, they moved to Granby to become the Granby Bisons, and in 1995 changed their names to the Granby Prédateurs. In 1996, the Prédateurs won the Memorial Cup. In 1997, the franchise was relocated to Sydney to become the Cape Breton Screaming Eagles.  Prior to the Eagles' arrival, Sydney played host to the American Hockey League (AHL)'s Cape Breton Oilers from 1988 to 1996.

Early years in Cape Breton (1997–1999)

The Screaming Eagles' first captain was Daniel Payette under coach Dany Dubé.

The Vincent era (1999–2008)
In 1999, Pascal Vincent was hired as the new head coach and general manager. The Screaming Eagles attempted to strengthen the club by drafting future National Hockey League (NHL) star Ilya Kovalchuk tenth overall in the 2000 CHL Import Draft. However, Kovalchuk declined to report to the team. Along with star players Marc-André Fleury, Dominic Noel, Stuart MacRae and Stephen Dixon, the Screaming Eagles reached the QMJHL's conference final in 2002, only to lose in five games to Acadie-Bathurst Titan. Fleury's number 29 jersey went on to be retired by the Screaming Eagles in 2008. Kovalchuk's number 71 was retired in 2014, as an April Fools' Day prank.

Vincent stacked the Screaming Eagles lineup with many NHL prospects for the 2003–04 season in hopes of bringing a league title to Cape Breton.  After the Screaming Eagles won 49 games and captured a division title, with Fleury also returning from the Pittsburgh Penguins before the playoffs, but the Screaming Eagles lost in the second round to the Chicoutimi Saguenéens.

At the 2004 QMJHL Draft, the Screaming Eagles chose James Sheppard with the first overall pick. In 2006–07, along with star players Luc Bourdon, Ondrej Pavelec and Oskars Bartulis, Sheppard led the Screaming Eagles to the league semifinals, only to lose in seven games to the Val-d'Or Foreurs.

The 2007–08 season saw 16-year-old goaltender Olivier Roy rise to prominence. The Screaming Eagles finished fourth in their division and won their first round playoff series despite having a roster that normally dressed at least ten rookies. Vincent went on to be named the 2008 QMJHL Coach of the Year. Following the end of the season, Vincent became the head coach and general manager of the Montreal Junior Hockey Club.

2010s history (2008–2019)

Following Vincent's departure, assistant coach Mario Durocher took over the role of head coach and general manager. In a bid to host the Memorial Cup in 2012, Durocher added former NHL players Mike McPhee and Guy Chouinard, former NHL coach Pierre Creamer and Michel Boucher to the hockey staff in consulting roles in 2010. Durocher was relieved of his duties on April 12, 2011, after a lackluster season in which the team finished 16th in the league and last in the Atlantic Division with just 41 points.

The team's then-head coach Ron Choules replaced Durocher as general manager in April 2011, though the team failed to improve on the ice. After a poor start to the 2012–13 season, Choules himself was fired on December 3, 2012, with former Val-d'Or head coach Marc-André Dumont announced as his replacement. The Screaming Eagles failed to reach the playoffs for the first time in franchise history in the 2012–13 season. At season's end, assistant coach Jean-François David was fired.

After being eliminated in the second round of the 2019 playoffs, the Screaming Eagles fired their coaching staff. Dumont was replaced with Nova Scotia native, Jake Grimes, along with former Eagles alumni Chris Culligan as assistant coach.

The team mascot is an eagle named Screech.

Cape Breton Eagles (2019–present)
On August 14, 2019, the team rebranded itself as the Cape Breton Eagles.

On November 30, 2021, head coach Jake Grimes resigned as head coach citing personal reasons. He finished with a winning record overall with the club, at 46–34–0–7 record over one-and-a-half seasons but had started the 2021–22 season with a 6–14–0–4 record. The Eagles spent approximately two months with an interim head coach before hiring Chadd Cassidy on January 7, 2022.

NHL alumni
List of alumni to play in the National Hockey League (NHL):

Luke Adam
Mark Barberio
Oskars Bartulis
Drake Batherson
Clark Bishop
Luc Bourdon
William Carrier
Jean-Philippe Côté
Pierre-Luc Dubois
Giovanni Fiore
Marc-André Fleury
Ryan Flinn
Martin Houle
Tomas Kloucek
Guillaume Lefebvre
Maxime Lagacé
Adam Pardy
Ondrej Pavelec
Alexandre R. Picard
Tim Ramholt
Logan Shaw
James Sheppard
Egor Sokolov
Evgeny Svechnikov

NHL first round draft picks
List of first round picks in the NHL Entry Draft:

2003 – Marc-André Fleury, #1 overall Pittsburgh Penguins
2006 – James Sheppard, #9 overall Minnesota Wild
2015 – Evgeny Svechnikov, #19 overall Detroit Red Wings
2016 – Pierre-Luc Dubois, #3 overall Columbus Blue Jackets

Retired numbers
#7 – Chris Culligan
#29 – Marc-André Fleury

Award winners
List of award winners:

CHL Scholastic Player of the Year
2007–08: Robert Slaney

Humanitarian Award
2009–10: Nick MacNeil

Jacques Plante Memorial Trophy
2003–04: Martin Houle (2.32)
2005–06: Ondrej Pavelec (2.51)
2006–07: Ondrej Pavelec (2.52)

Kevin Lowe Trophy
2019–20: Adam McCormick

Luc Robitaille Trophy
2006–07: Cape Breton (308)

Marcel Robert Trophy
2004–05: Guillaume Demers
2007–08: Robert Slaney

Maurice Filion Trophy
2006–07: Pascal Vincent

Mike Bossy Trophy
2002–03: Marc-André Fleury

Philips Plaque
2001–02: Pierre-Luc Emond

Raymond Lagacé Trophy
2005–06: Ondrej Pavelec
2007–08: Olivier Roy

RDS Cup
2005–06: Ondrej Pavelec
2007–08: Olivier Roy

Robert Lebel Trophy
2003–04: Cape Breton (2.33)

Ron Lapointe Trophy
2007–08: Pascal Vincent

Telus Cup – Defensive
2002–03: Marc-André Fleury
2004–05: Martin Houle

Season-by-season record
As of the 2020–21 season:

Regular season
OL = Overtime loss, SL = Shootout loss, Pct = Winning percentage

Playoffs

See also
List of ice hockey teams in Nova Scotia

References

External links
 Official Site

Sport in the Cape Breton Regional Municipality
Quebec Major Junior Hockey League teams
Ice hockey teams in Nova Scotia
1969 establishments in Nova Scotia
Ice hockey clubs established in 1969